The imperial election of 1764 was an imperial election held to select the emperor of the Holy Roman Empire.  It took place in Frankfurt on March 27.

Background 
The Holy Roman Emperor Francis I, Holy Roman Emperor called for the election of his successor.  The prince-electors called to Frankfurt were:

 Emmerich Joseph von Breidbach zu Bürresheim, elector of Mainz
 Johann IX Philipp von Walderdorff, elector of Trier
 Maximilian Friedrich von Königsegg-Rothenfels, elector of Cologne
 Maria Theresa, queen regnant of Bohemia
 Maximilian III Joseph, elector of Bavaria
 Frederick Augustus III, elector of Saxony
 Frederick II, elector of Brandenburg
 Charles Theodore, elector of the Electoral Palatinate
 George III, elector of Brunswick-Lüneburg

Elected 
Joseph II, Holy Roman Emperor, the eldest son of Francis and Maria Theresa, was elected.

Aftermath 
Joseph came to the throne on the death of his father on August 18, 1765.

1764
1764 in the Holy Roman Empire
1764 in politics
18th-century elections in Europe
Non-partisan elections
Joseph II, Holy Roman Emperor